Fernando Henrique Quintela Cavalcante (born 3 May 1990 in São Paulo), commonly known as Nando, is a Brazilian footballer who plays as a midfielder for PAEEK in the Cypriot Second Division.

Career
In January 2014, Fernando signed with Zimbru Chișinău from Moldovan National Division.

In July 2015, Fernando signed a 2-year contract with Cypriot club THOI Lakatamia.

In June 2017, he signed a 1-year contract with Bulgarian Second League side Oborishte.  He left the club at the end of the season following the relegation to Third League. In June 2019, Nando returned to Bulgaria, signing a two-year contract with Dunav Ruse.

Honours
Zimbru
Moldovan Cup: 2013–14

References

External links
 
 
 
 
 Fernando Henrique at Soccerwiki

1990 births
Living people
Footballers from São Paulo
Brazilian footballers
Brazilian expatriate footballers
Association football forwards
Expatriate footballers in France
Expatriate footballers in Israel
Expatriate footballers in Libya
Expatriate footballers in Moldova
Expatriate footballers in Cyprus
Expatriate footballers in Bulgaria
Brazilian expatriate sportspeople in France
Brazilian expatriate sportspeople in Israel
Brazilian expatriate sportspeople in Libya
Brazilian expatriate sportspeople in Moldova
Brazilian expatriate sportspeople in Cyprus
Brazilian expatriate sportspeople in Bulgaria
Associação Ferroviária de Esportes players
Nacional Atlético Clube (SP) players
Sport Club Corinthians Alagoano players
Bnei Sakhnin F.C. players
Al-Ittihad Club (Tripoli) players
FC Zimbru Chișinău players
ENTHOI Lakatamia FC players
FC Oborishte players
PAEEK players
FC Dunav Ruse players
Moldovan Super Liga players
Second Professional Football League (Bulgaria) players
Cypriot Second Division players
First Professional Football League (Bulgaria) players
Libyan Premier League players